is a Japanese manga series by Ken Koyama. The series follows the titular character, an anthropomorphized period, as she visits menstruating women in various scenarios and contexts. Launched as a webcomic in 2017, Little Miss P was serialized in the manga magazine Monthly Comic Beam from January 2017 to October 2020 and was adapted into a live-action film in 2019. The series has been critically acclaimed, and won a Tezuka Osamu Cultural Prize in 2019.

Synopsis
Each chapter in the series follows a particular woman as she is visited by Little Miss P, an anthropomorphic representation of her period. While the women dread Little Miss P's arrival – particularly her "Period Punch", representing menstrual cramping – as an individual she is steadfast and caring, and frequently supports the women through a personal problem or emotional turmoil. Throughout the series, Little Miss P visits women in a wide range of situations and historical contexts; one particular chapter follows a woman in the Edo period who is made to live in a menstruation hut, while another is a fictionalized biography of Yoshiko Sakai, who produced the first commercial sanitary napkins sold in Japan.

Characters
 Little Miss P
 An anthropomorphized representation of menstruation who visits women monthly. A practitioner of tough love, the fatigue and pain she imposes on the women she visits is belied by her supportive and understanding personality.
 
 Mr. Libido
 An anthropomorphized representation of sex drive. He is shaped like a cartoon penis, and speaks exclusively in lewd and obscene language.

 Mr. Virginity
 An anthropomorphized representation of virginity. He has a kind personality, but is somewhat coddling.

 Little Miss PMS
 An anthropomorphized representation of premenstrual syndrome. Appears in a bonus chapter in the collected edition of the series.

Media

Manga
The series was first published in 2017 as a web comic on the comedy website Omocoro under the title . Kadokawa collected the series as a tankōbon bound volume in March 2018, and began serializing new chapters of series as Seiri-chan in its manga magazine Monthly Comic Beam in November 2018. That same month, Yen Press announced that it would publish an English-language translation of the series under the title Little Miss P, with the first volume released in June 2019. A Little Miss P stuffed toy was released in April 2019 to commemorate the release of the manga's second volume. The third volume was released on May 11, 2020.

Film
A live-action film adaptation of Little Miss P was announced in the February 2019 issue of Monthly Comic Beam, and was released in Japan on November 8, 2019. Similarly to the episodic structure of the original manga, the film follows three women and their interactions with Little Miss P. The film was directed by Shunsuke Shinada, written by Shin Akamatsu, and stars Fumi Nikaidō, Sairi Ito, and Risaki Matsukaze. Its theme song, "Suru", is performed by The Peggies.

Reception

Manga
Little Miss P has been positively received by critics, with the web comic version of the series having been viewed over 20 million times. Comics Beat commended the series' balancing of serious and comedic elements, stating that Little Miss P "offers a necessarily complex relationship between women, their time of the month, and the world." Anime UK News called the series a "knowledgeable, thoughtful and outright fun read" and "an entertaining read on a usually taboo subject." Anime News Network praised the series' frank portrayal of menstruation, but criticized the quality of its artwork.

In the 2019 edition Takarajimasha's annual Kono Manga ga Sugoi! ranking of the best manga of the year, Little Miss P was selected as one of the top 20 titles for female readers. That same year, Little Miss P won the Tezuka Osamu Cultural Prize in the Short Work category.

Film
The Japan Times gave the film adaptation of Little Miss P 3.5 out of 5 stars, stating that despite its simplistic plot, the film is "a whimsically engaging, gently insightful look at a subject usually consigned to the shadows and passed over in silence." The film placed in fifth in mini-theater ticket sales in its opening weekend.

Daimaru Little Miss P badges
In November 2019, the Umeda branch of the Japanese department store Daimaru launched a program wherein menstruating employees could elect to wear a "women's wellbeing" badge that featured the cartoon character Little Miss P. While the company stated that the program was intended to better accommodate menstruating employees, it faced criticism over its potential to subject menstruating employees to workplace harassment. Following a public outcry, Daimaru stated that it was "reconsidering" the program.

See also
Sex Ed 120%, a sex education manga which also covers menstruation.

References

External links
 Official film adaptation website 
 

2017 manga
Comedy anime and manga
Enterbrain manga
Seinen manga
Yen Press titles
Japanese comedy films